Ermengol (or Armengol) VI (10961154), called el de Castilla ("the one from Castile"), was the Count of Urgell from 1102 to his death. He was the son and successor of Ermengol V and María Pérez, daughter of Count Pedro Ansúrez, Lord of Valladolid, who became his tutor when he was orphaned in 1102.

Life
He was born in Valladolid, whence his nickname comes. During his minority, he was under the regency of his grandfather, Pedro Ansúrez, but the real power lay in the hands of Guerau II of Cabrera and Raymond Berenguer III of Barcelona. With their help, the young count conquered Balaguer in 1105  and made it his capital.

Armengol collaborated with Alfonso the Battler in the 1118 capture of Zaragoza and in the expedition of Alfonso VII the Emperor, of whom he was his mayordomo mayor, against Almería in 1147.   In 1133, Ermengol ceded Andorra to the Bishop of Urgell. He had good relations with the House of Barcelona and he accompanied Raymond Berenguer IV to Provence in 1144. In 1149, he assisted Raymond Berenguer in the conquest and repopulation of Lleida, receiving one-third of the city which was thenceforward of his dominion.

He was a patron of several religious establishments, including Solsona Cathedral as well as the Monastery of Santa María de Retuerta in Valladolid which had been founded by his father-in-law, Pedro Ansurez.

On 24 March 1144, Count Ermengol drafted his will and named several executors, including his wife Elvira and his father-in-law, Count Rodrigo González de Lara. Even though he asked to be buried at Solsona Cathedral, when he died in the Kingdom of Castile on 20 June 1154, he was buried at the Monastery of Santa María de Valbuena, founded by his sister Stephanie, the widow of Fernando García de Hita and Rodrigo González de Lara.

Marriages and issue
Before August 1126, he married Arsenda de Cabrera, daughter of Guerau II de Cabrera, first viscount of Ager, and sister of Ponce Giraldo de Cabrera. They divorced and she married as her second husband Galcerán de Sales, son of Arnaldo Iohannis, with whom she had a son, also named Galcerán de Sales, who died with his half-brother, Ermengol VII.  Ermengol and Arsenda were the parents of:

Ermengol VII, who succeeded his father as count of Urgell.

He married a second time, before September 1135, to Elvira Rodríguez, daughter of Count Rodrigo González de Lara and Sancha of Castile, an illegitimate daughter of King Alfonso VI of León. To this union were born: 
 María, better known as Maria de Almenara, lady of Miranda de Ebro, Almenara and Palazuelos de la Sierra, the wife of Lope López de Vizcaya, a natural son of Count Lope Díaz I de Haro. Maria was buried at the Abbey of Santa María la Real de Las Huelgas.
 Isabel de Urgel.  In 1152, Ermengol and his wife Elvira negotiated the marriage of this daughter with Ramon Folc III of Cardona.

Notes

References

Bibliography

 
 

 
 
 

 
 

 
 

1096 births
1154 deaths
Counts of Urgell
People from Valladolid
12th-century Catalan people